The following is a list of notable events and releases of the year 2004 in Norwegian music.

Events

January
 1 – The pop/country singer Kurt Nilsen, whom won the first season of the Norwegian version of the reality television show Pop Idol in May 2003, wins the World Idol competition which was a one-off international version of Pop Idol featuring winners of the various national Idol shows.
 22 – The 7th Polarjazz started in Longyearbyen, Svalbard (January 22 – 25).
 30 – The 23rd annual Djangofestival started on Cosmopolite in Oslo (January 30 – 31).

February
 5 – Kristiansund Opera Festival opened (February 5 – 21).

March
 6 – The election of the participant for Norway in the Eurovision Song Contest 2004.
 12 – The annual By:Larm started in Oslo (March 12 – 15).

April
 2
 The 31st Vossajazz started at Voss (April 2 – 4).
 Magne Thormodsæter was awarded Vossajazzprisen 2004.
 3 – Svein Folkvord performs the commissioned work Across for Vossajazz 2004.
 23 –  Ole Blues started in Bergen (April 23 – May 1).

May
 11 – The 15th MaiJazz started in Stavanger (May 11 – 15).
 19
The start of Bergen International Music Festival Festspillene i Bergen (May 19 – 30).
 The 32nd Nattjazz started in Bergen (May 19 – 29).

June
 16 – The Norwegian Wood started in Oslo (June 16 – 19).
 30 – The 40th Kongsberg Jazzfestival started in Kongsberg (June 30 – July 3).

July
 12 – The 44th Moldejazz started in Molde (July 12 – 17).
 20 – Maria Mena performs "You're the Only One" on Late Show with David Letterman.

August
 9 – The 19th Oslo Jazzfestival started in Oslo (August 9 – 15).
 11 – The 18th Sildajazz started in Haugesund (August 11 – 15).

September
 1 – The Trondheim Jazz Festival started in Trondheim (September 1 – 5).
 14 – The DølaJazz started in Lillehammer (September 14 – 17).
 30 – The 2nd Ekkofestival started in Bergen (September 30 – Oktober 3.

Oktober
 3 – The Ultima Oslo Contemporary Music Festival started in Oslo (Oktober 3 – 17).
 26 – The 3rd Insomnia Festival started in Tromsø (October 26 – 28).

November
 2 – The Oslo World Music Festival started in Oslo (November 2 – 7).

December
  11– The Nobel Peace Prize Concert was held in Oslo Spektrum.

Albums released

August

September

Unknown date

A
 Eivind Aarset
 Connected (Jazzland Recordings)

S
 Karl Seglem
 New North (NorCD)

Deaths

January
 14 – Terje Bakken, rock singer known as "Valfar", Windir (born 1978).

February
 20 – Ørnulf Gulbransen, classical flautist (born 1916).

May
 13 – Kjell Bækkelund, classical pianist (born 1930).

July
 2 – Carsten Klouman, jazz pianist and band leader (born 1923).

October
 2 – Bjørnar Andresen, jazz bassist (born 1945).
 13 – Erik Bye, journalist, artist, author, film actor, folk singer and radio and television personality (born 1926).
 16 – Jon Bratt Otnes, opera singer and diplomat (born 1919).

December
 21 – Arild Nyquist, singer, author, and visual artist (born 1937).
 26 – Sigurd Køhn, jazz saxophonist, tsunami (born 1959).

See also
 2004 in Norway
 Music of Norway
 Norway in the Eurovision Song Contest 2004

References

 
Norwegian music
Norwegian
Music
2000s in Norwegian music